Mindaugas Gedminas (born 13 September 1996) is a Norwegian amateur boxer. He is a two-time Norwegian champion and two-time Scandinavian champion and represented Norway at the 2019 European Games and the European Olympic Qualifications 2020.

He is preparing to be the first boxer in twenty-four years to represent Norway at an Olympic Games in 2021. He attended the Olympic Qualifications in London 2020 and defeated European champion and 2016 Olympian Balazs Bacskai in his first fight.

Gedminas is known for his technical boxing style with great footwork and keeping his opponents at a long distance. His style is of early Soviet boxing origins. His boxing technique comes from his Russian (Chechen) coach Zayndi Arsaev, who is a four-time Russian champion.

Biography 
Mindaugas Gedminas was born on 13 September 1996 in Šiauliai, Lithuania. He is of Lithuanian origin and has a younger brother.

Mindaugas lived the first 15 years of his life in Lithuania where he also started training Judo and Thai boxing in Siauliai at the age of 12. In 2012 he moved to Norway with his family and has been living there since then. His first year in Norway he went to Mandal Videregående and later he started at KKG Kristiansand where he chose to specify his education in sports. Immediately after moving to Norway, Gedminas started training thai boxing at Oksa Muay Thai, Kristiansand. After completing his goals in thai boxing, he decided to switch to boxing and has become Norwegian and Nordic boxing champion. At the age of 17, Gedminas decided to focus fully on his boxing career and moved out from his family in Lindesnes to live in Kristiansand, closer to the boxing gym. Mindaugas finished his school in 2016 and started at University of Agder in 2018. He found out that he needed to focus fully and only on his sports career and stopped his education in 2019. Mindaugas wanted to make boxing more popular in his city and decided to start his own group MG Boxing where he held group trainings and gave boxing advices.

Boxing career 
Gedminas wanted to add more boxing skills to his Thai boxing career, so he decided to start training boxing in one of the oldest boxing clubs in Norway, AIK Lund. There he met his current trainer Zayindi Arsaev and found soon out that he has a better potential in becoming boxing champion. He continued to train and compete in both sports. After winning many fights in boxing, he decided in 2016 to go fully for his boxing career and quit Thai boxing. Until 2016 he had been on boxing tournaments and won all his fights.

In 2016 he decided to participate in Norwegian boxing championship, where he was for the first time defeated against 9 timer Norwegian champion, Martin Larsen, and won a silver medal. That motivated him to work harder and travel to several training camps in both Thailand and Lithuania. He came back stronger and his results got better by defeating several high class international boxers.

Mindaugas participated again in Norwegian championship in 2017 and he took his revenge and defeated Martin Larsen. After that championship, Mindaugas was ranked as number one boxer in middleweight class in Norway, where Anders Eggan was in second place, Alborz Sabet nr.3 and Martin Larsen in fourth place. Immediately after national championships he got selected by the Norwegian National Team to represent Norway in Nordic championships. Gedminas made a big sensation, won a gold medal and became a Nordic boxing champion in middleweight class, where he defeated Dimitri Tretyak from Finland and Oliver Flodin from Sweden. In October 2017 Mindaugas won first place in HSK Box cup, Denmark and also became the best male boxer of the tournament. Right after, he won another gold medal at Vest Jysk boxing tournament in Denmark 2017.

In 2018 Mindaugas represented Norway in several international tournaments and won for the first time the Norwegian championships. He also won for the second time the Nordic championships. After that he participated in King of the Ring tournament in Sweden, where he won three fights and claimed gold medal. Gedminas also competed in Golden Glove tournament in Nis, Serbia. There he defeated Serbias number one boxer and lost the semifinals on points against a Russian opponent. Mindaugas claimed a bronze medal in the Golden Glove tournament 2018. For the first time he fought 5 fights in 6 days that week.

Gedminas won the 2019 Norwegian championship for the second time. He then took part in the international Grand Prix AIBA tournament, held in Usti Nad Labbern, Czech Republic. Gedminas defeated a boxer from Turkey and lost in semifinals against Salvatore Callavaro from Italy, where he won a bronze medal. Right after the tournament, Mindaugas started his preparation for the second European Games in Misnk, Belarus 2019. His preparations included training camp in Berlin, Oslo and Kristiansand. In the second European Games, Mindaugas became the first Norwegian boxer in history to take a victory there. He won against Lithuania's best boxer, Vytautas Balsys, and lost on split decision 3–2 against Salvatore Callavaro, who took a silver medal. Later that year, Gedminas went to a training camp in Lithuania, where he trained with Olympic bronze medalist 2012, Evaldas Petrauskas. Gedminas continued with his preparations for the Olympic qualifications by travelling to Nur-Sultan, Kazakhstan for two weeks training camp.

Personal life 
Mindaugas Gedminas currently lives in Kristiansand, Norway with his girlfriend Sevina Ognyanova. He trains constantly with his coach at AIK Lund and keeps himself in shape by training at the Olympiatoppen Sør where he also gets professional advice.

References 

Norwegian boxers
1996 births
Living people
European Games competitors for Norway
Boxers at the 2019 European Games